Omadoy Otakuziyeva (born 4 April 1996) is an Uzbekistani weightlifter. She won the silver medal in the women's 75kg event at the 2018 Asian Games held in Jakarta, Indonesia.

In 2017, she won the bronze medal in the women's 75kg event at the Islamic Solidarity Games held in Baku, Azerbaijan. In that same year, she also won the silver medal in the women's 75kg event at the 2017 Asian Indoor and Martial Arts Games held in Ashgabat, Turkmenistan.

References

External links 
 

Living people
1996 births
Place of birth missing (living people)
Uzbekistani female weightlifters
Weightlifters at the 2018 Asian Games
Medalists at the 2018 Asian Games
Asian Games silver medalists for Uzbekistan
Asian Games medalists in weightlifting
Islamic Solidarity Games medalists in weightlifting
21st-century Uzbekistani women